This is a list of notable painters from, or associated with, Croatia.

A 
Oskar Alexander (1876–1953)
Lovro Artuković (born 1959)

B
Ljubo Babić (1890–1974)
Robert Baća (1949–2019)
Vladimir Becić (1886–1954)
Federiko Benković (1667–1753)
Lujo Bezeredi (1898–1979)
Charles Billich (born 1934)
Bernardo Bobić (died c.1695)
Nikola Božidarević (c.1460–1517)
Vlaho Bukovac (1855–1922)
Eugen Buktenica (1914–1997)
Andrija Buvina (13th Century)

C
Bela Čikoš Sesija (1864–1931)
Giulio Clovio (1498–1578)
Menci Klement Crnčić (1865–1930)
Josip Crnobori (1907–2005)

D
Virgil Meneghello Dinčić (1876–1944)
Lovro Dobričević (c.1420–1478)
Jelena Dorotka (1876–1965)

E
Marta Ehrlich (1910–1980)

F
Emerik Feješ (1904–1969)
Eva Fischer (1920–2015)

G
Dragan Gaži (1930–1983)
Vilko Gecan (1894–1973)
Ivan Generalić (1914–1992)
Josip Generalić (1935–2004)
Oton Gliha (1914–1999)
Petar Grgec (1933–2006)

H
Krsto Hegedušić (1901–1975)
Oskar Herman (1886–1974)
Josip Horvat Međimurec (1904–1945)
Hugo Conrad von Hötzendorf (c.1807–1869)

I
Nina Ivančić (born 1953)
Oton Iveković (1869–1939)

J
Marijan Jevšovar (1922–1998)
John of Kastav (15th Century)
Ignjat Job (1895–1936)
Drago Jurak (1911–1994)

K
Vjekoslav Karas (1821–1858)
Albert Kinert (1919–1987)
Jozo Kljaković (1889–1969)
Mira Klobučar (1888–1956)
Julije Klović (1498–1578)
Edo Kovačević (1906–1993)
Mijo Kovačić (born 1935)
Julije Knifer (1924–2004)
Ladislav Kralj (1891–1976)
Miroslav Kraljević (1885–1913)
Živa Kraus (born 1945)
Kristian Kreković (1901–1985)
Tomislav Krizman (1882–1955)
Izidor Kršnjavi (1845–1927)
Alfred Krupa Sr. (1915–1989)
Alfred Freddy Krupa (born 1971)
Ferdinand Kulmer (1925–1998)
Heddy Kun (born 1936)

L
Ivan Lacković Croata (1932–2004)
Loren Ligorio (born 1955)
Vasko Lipovac (1931–2006)
Zvonimir Lončarić (1927–2004)

M
Celestin Medović (1857–1920)
Martin Mehkek (1936–2014)
Ivan Milat-Luketa (1922–2009)
Jerolim Miše (1890–1970)
Tina Morpurgo (1907–1944)
Antun Motika (1902–1992)
Franjo Mraz (1910–1981)
Marko Murat (1864–1944)
Edo Murtić (1921–2005)

N
Virgilije Nevjestić (1935–2009)

P
Alfred Pal (1920–2010)
Renato Percan (1936–2013); painter
Ordan Petlevski (1930–1997)
Ivan Picelj (1924–2011)
Vera Nikolić Podrinska (1886–1972)
Dimitrije Popović (born 1951)
Oton Postružnik (1900–1978)

Q
Ferdo Quiquerez (1845–1893)

R
Ivan Rabuzin (1921–2008)
Josip Račić (1885–1908)
Mirko Rački (1879–1982)
Ivan Ranger (1700–1753)
Božidar Rašica (1912–1992)
Slava Raškaj (1877–1906)
Ivan Rein (1905–1943)
Branko Ružić (1919–1997)

S
Giorgio Schiavone (c.1436–1504)
Đuro Seder (born 1927–2022)
Branko Šenoa (1879–1939)
Zlatko Sirotić (born 1945)
Matija Skurjeni (1898–1990)
Petar Smajić (1910–1985)
Aleksandar Srnec (1924–2010)
Miljenko Stančić (1926–1977)
Zlatko Šulentić (1893–1971)
Miroslav Šutej (1936–2005)

T
Marino Tartaglia (1894–1984)
Đuro Tiljak (1895–1965)
Ivan Tišov (1870–1928)
Ivana Tomljenović-Meller (1906–1988)
Lavoslav Torti (1875–1942)
Marijan Trepše (1887–1964)
Ana Tzarev (born 1937)

U
Milivoj Uzelac (1897–1977)

V
Maksimilijan Vanka (1889–1963)
Vladimir Varlaj (1895–1962)
Ivan Večenaj (1920–2013)
Mladen Veža (1916–2010)
Emanuel Vidović (1870–1953)
Mirko Virius (1889–1943)

W
Adolf Waldinger (1843–1904)

See also
 List of Croatian artists

References

Painters
 
Croatian painters
Painters